The Capulidae, the cap snails or cap shells, are a taxonomic family of limpet-like sea snails, marine gastropod molluscs in the clade Littorinimorpha. Capulidae is the only family in the superfamily Capuloidea. According to taxonomy of the Gastropoda by Bouchet & Rocroi (2005) the family Capulidae has no subfamilies.

The name Trichotropidae was previously used for this family, but this name is invalid, as it is a junior synonym.

Genera
Genera within the family Capulidae include:
 Ariadnaria Habe, 1961
 † Blackdownia Kollmann, 1976  
 Capulus Montfort, 1810
 Cerithioderma   Conrad, 1860  (?)
 Ciliatotropis Golikov, 1986
 Discotrichoconcha Powell, 1951
 Echinospira Girotti, 1970
 Hyalorisia Dall, 1889
 Icuncula Iredale, 1924
 Krebsia Montfort, 1810 (?)
 Lippistes  Montfort, 1810  (?)
 Neoiphinoe  Habe, 1978 
 Malluvium Melvill, 1906 (?)
 Rufodardanula Ponder, 1965 (?)
 Separatista Gray, 1847
 Torellia Lovén in Jeffreys, 1867
 Trichamathina Habe, 1962
 Trichosirius Finlay, 1926  (?)
 Trichotropis Broderip and G. B. Sowerby I, 1829
 Turritropis Habe, 1961
 Verticosta S.-I Huang & M.-H. Lin, 2020
 Zelippistes Finlay, 1927 (?)
 Genera brought into synonymy 
 Actita Fischer von Waldheim, 1823: synonym of Capulus Montfort, 1810
 Antitrichotropis Powell, 1951: synonym of Torellia Jeffreys, 1867
 Brocchia Bronn, 1828: synonym of Capulus Montfort, 1810
 Capulonix Iredale, 1929: synonym of Capulus Montfort, 1810
 Iphinoe  H. Adams & A. Adams, 1856 : synonym of Neoiphinoe Habe, 1978
 Neoconcha E.A. Smith, 1907: synonym of Torellia (Neoconcha) E.A. Smith, 1907
 Ovotropis Egorov & Alexeyev, 1998: synonym of Neoiphinoe Habe, 1978
 Pileopsis Lamarck, 1822 : synonym of Capulus Montfort, 1810
 Trichoconcha E.A. Smith, 1907: synonym of Torellia Jeffreys, 1867

References

 Powell A. W. B., New Zealand Mollusca, William Collins Publishers Ltd, Auckland, New Zealand 1979 
 Vaught, K.C. (1989). A classification of the living Mollusca. American Malacologists: Melbourne, FL (USA). . XII, 195 pp
 Discover Life

External links 
 image of Capulus dilatatus
 
 Miocene Gastropods and Biostratigraphy of the Kern River Area, California; United States Geological Survey Professional Paper 642